In the early morning hours of July 7, 2005, the Pennsylvania General Assembly passed pay increases for state lawmakers, judges, and top executive-branch officials. The vote took place at 2 am without public review or commentary and Governor Ed Rendell signed the bill into law. The raise increased legislators' base pay from 16% to 34% depending on position.

Provisions
The pay raise included a provision allowing legislators to take their raises immediately in the form of "unvouchered expenses."  This provision was included due to the Pennsylvania Constitution's clause prohibiting legislators from taking salary increases in the same term as which they are passed.  State courts have ruled similar legislation to be constitutional on three separate occasions.

Reaction
Outrage over the pay raise was picked up by several influential state blogs like Grassrootspa and PennPatriot Blog. Advocacy groups spawned several grass-roots movements, some geared toward voting out incumbents and some seeking support for a Constitutional Convention or a reduction in the size of the legislature. The legislature repealed the pay raise after four months by a 50–0 vote in the senate and 197–1 vote in the house.

Political aftermath

The first victim of the public uproar was Supreme Court Justice Russell M. Nigro who became the first Pennsylvania Supreme Court Justice to be denied retention. Nigro asserted that he had not taken part in the pay raise.  However, critics noted that Chief Justice Ralph Cappy helped draft the bill and that prior Court opinions upheld such practices.

On November 16, 2005, Governor Rendell signed a repeal of the pay raise after a near unanimous vote for repeal; only House Minority Whip Mike Veon voted against the repeal.

Despite the repeal, a total of 17 legislators were defeated in the 2006 primary elections including Senate President Pro Tempore Robert Jubelirer and Senate Majority Leader David J. Brightbill.  They were the first  top-ranking Pennsylvania legislative leaders to lose a primary election since 1964.

The November 2006 General Election claimed several more members who supported the pay raise including Republican representatives Gene McGill, Matt Wright, Tom Gannon and Matthew Good and Democrat Veon. The defeats were widely attributed to anger over the pay raise.

Frank LaGrotta, who was defeated in the 2006 primary election over the pay raise issue, was one of many legislators who were paying back their unvouchered expenses in installments. After pleading guilty to two counts of conflict of interest for hiring relatives as "ghost employees," he stopped repayment and was even refunded the amount that he had previously returned.

Legacy
In November 2009, Barbara McIlvaine Smith announced that she would not run for re-election in 2010, saying that she was frustrated with the progress of the post-pay raise reform movement. However, she ultimately did run for re-election in 2010 and lost to Republican challenger Dan Truitt.

See also
2006 Pennsylvania General Assembly bonus controversy
Russ Diamond
Eric Epstein
Drew Crompton
Chris Lilik
Gene Stilp
 List of Pennsylvania state legislatures

References 

Pennsylvania General Assembly Pay Raise Controversy, 2005
Pennsylvania General Assembly pay raise controversy
Pennsylvania
Pennsylvania General Assembly pay raise controversy